The American Hockey League (AHL) is a professional ice hockey league based in the United States and Canada that serves as the primary developmental league for the National Hockey League (NHL). Since the 2010–11 season, every team in the league has an affiliation agreement with one NHL team. When NHL teams do not have an AHL affiliate, players are assigned to AHL teams affiliated with other NHL teams. Twenty-six AHL teams are located in the United States and the remaining six are in Canada. The league offices are located in Springfield, Massachusetts, and its current president is Scott Howson.

In general, a player must be at least 18 years of age to play in the AHL or not currently be beholden to a junior ice hockey team. The league limits the number of experienced professional players on a team's active roster during any given game; only five skaters can have accumulated four full seasons of play or more at the professional level (goaltenders are exempt from this rule and can stay in the AHL indefinitely without being subject to this cap). The AHL allows for practice squad contracts.

The annual playoff champion is awarded the Calder Cup, named for Frank Calder, the first President (1917–1943) of the NHL. The defending champions are the Chicago Wolves in 2022, who are the first team to win the Calder Cup since the Charlotte Checkers in 2019.

History

Predecessor leagues
The AHL traces its origins directly to two predecessor professional leagues: the Canadian-American Hockey League (the "Can-Am" League), founded in 1926, and the first International Hockey League, established in 1929. Although the Can-Am League never operated with more than six teams, the departure of the Boston Bruin Cubs after the 1935–36 season reduced it down to just four member clubs – the Springfield Indians, Philadelphia Ramblers, Providence Reds, and New Haven Eagles – for the first time in its history. At the same time, the then-rival IHL lost half of its eight members after the 1935–36 season, also leaving it with just four member teams: the Buffalo Bisons, Syracuse Stars, Pittsburgh Hornets, and Cleveland Falcons.

1936–1938
With both leagues down to the bare minimum number of teams to be viable, the governors of both leagues recognized the need for action to assure their member clubs' long-term survival. Their solution was to play an interlocking schedule. While the Can-Am was based in the Northeast and the IHL in the Great Lakes, their footprints were close enough for this to be a viable option. The two leagues' eight surviving clubs began joint play in November 1936 as a new two-division "circuit of mutual convenience" known as the International-American Hockey League. The four Can-Am teams became the I-AHL East Division, with the IHL quartet playing as the West Division. The IHL also contributed its former championship trophy, the F. G. "Teddy" Oke Trophy, which would go to the regular-season winners of the merged league's West Division until 1952. The Oke Trophy is now awarded to the regular-season winners of the AHL's Northeast Division.

A little more than a month into that first season, the balance and symmetry of the new combined circuit suffered a setback when its membership unexpectedly fell to seven teams. The West's Buffalo Bisons were forced to cease operations on December 6, 1936, after playing just 11 games, because of what proved to be insurmountable financial problems and lack of access to a suitable arena; the Bisons' original arena, Peace Bridge Arena, had collapsed the previous season (a new Buffalo Bisons team would return to the league in 1940 after a new arena was constructed for them). The makeshift new I-AHL played out the rest of its first season (as well as all of the next) with just seven teams.

At the end of the 1936–37 season, a modified three-round playoff format was devised and a new championship trophy, the Calder Cup, was established. The Syracuse Stars defeated the Philadelphia Ramblers in the final, three-games-to-one, to win the first-ever Calder Cup championship. The Calder Cup continues on today as the AHL's playoff championship trophy.

Formal consolidation of the I-AHL
After two seasons of interlocking play, the governors of the two leagues' seven active teams met in New York City on June 28, 1938, and agreed that it was time to formally consolidate. Maurice Podoloff of New Haven, the former head of the Can-Am League, was elected the I-AHL's first president. The former IHL president, John Chick of Windsor, Ontario, became vice-president in charge of officials.

The new I-AHL also added an eighth franchise at the 1938 meeting to fill the void in its membership left by the loss of Buffalo two years earlier with the admission of the then two-time defending Eastern Amateur Hockey League (EAHL) champion Hershey Bears. The Bears remain the only one of these eight original I-AHL/AHL franchises to have been represented in the league without interruption since the 1938–39 season. The newly merged circuit also increased its regular-season schedule for each team by six games from 48 to 54.

Contraction, resurrection, and expansion
After the 1939–40 season the I-AHL renamed itself the American Hockey League. It generally enjoyed both consistent success on the ice and relative financial stability over its first three decades of operation. In the late 1960s and early 1970s, however, the cost of doing business in professional ice hockey began to rise sharply with NHL expansion and relocation (the NHL placed teams in Pittsburgh and Buffalo, forcing two long-time AHL clubs, the Pittsburgh Hornets and Buffalo Bisons, to fold) and especially the 1972 formation of the World Hockey Association (WHA), which forced the relocation and subsequent folding of the Cleveland Barons, Baltimore Clippers, and Quebec Aces. The number of major-league teams competing for players rose from six to thirty in just seven years. Player salaries at all levels shot up dramatically with the increased demand and competition for their services.

This did not seem to affect the AHL at first, as it expanded to 12 teams by 1970. However, to help compensate for the rise in player salaries, many NHL clubs cut back on the number of players they kept under contract for development, and players under AHL contracts could now also demand much higher paychecks to remain with their clubs. As a result, half of the AHL's teams folded from 1974 to 1977. The league bottomed out in the summer of 1977, with news that the Rhode Island (formerly Providence) Reds – the last remaining uninterrupted franchise from the 1936–37 season, and the oldest continuously operating minor league franchise in North America – had decided to cease operations after 51 years in Rhode Island.

The AHL appeared in serious danger of folding altogether if this downward trend was not reversed. However, two events in the fall of 1977 helped reverse the trend. The first of these was the decision of the NHL's Philadelphia Flyers to return to the league as a team owner, and the second was the unexpected collapse of the North American Hockey League just weeks before the start of the 1977–78 season.

The Flyers' new AHL franchise became the immediately successful Maine Mariners, which brought the new AHL city of Portland, Maine both the regular-season and Calder Cup playoff titles in each of that club's first two seasons of operation. The folding of the NAHL, meanwhile, suddenly left two of its stronger teams, the Philadelphia Firebirds and Binghamton, New York-based Broome Dusters, without a league to play in. The owners of the Dusters solved their problem by buying the Reds franchise and moving it to Binghamton as the Binghamton Dusters, while the Firebirds crossed over to the AHL from the NAHL. The Dusters and Firebirds, together with the Hampton Gulls (who had joined the league from the Southern Hockey League), boosted the AHL to nine member clubs as the 1977–78 season opened. Hampton folded on February 10, 1978, but was replaced the next year by the New Brunswick Hawks. With franchise stability improving after the demise of the WHA in 1979, the league continued to grow steadily over the years, reaching 20 clubs by the 2000–01 season.

Absorption of the IHL
In 2001–02, the AHL's membership jumped dramatically to 27 teams, mostly by the absorption of six teams—Milwaukee, Chicago, Houston, Utah, Manitoba, and Grand Rapids—from the International Hockey League. The IHL had established itself as the second top-level minor league circuit in North America, but folded in 2001 due to financial problems. One oddity caused by the AHL's 2001 expansion was that the league had two teams with the same nickname: the Milwaukee Admirals and the Norfolk Admirals. The latter team transferred to the league from the mid-level ECHL in 2000. This situation lasted until the end of the 2014–15 season when the Norfolk team moved to San Diego and was replaced by another ECHL team with the same name.

The Utah Grizzlies suspended operations after the 2004–05 season (the franchise was sold in 2006 and returned to the ice in Cleveland in 2007 as the Lake Erie Monsters, now known as the Cleveland Monsters). The Chicago Wolves (2002, 2008), Houston Aeros (2003), Milwaukee Admirals (2004), and Grand Rapids Griffins (2013, 2017) have all won Calder Cup titles since joining the AHL from the IHL. Chicago and Milwaukee have also made multiple trips to the Calder Cup Finals, and Houston made their second Finals appearance in 2011.

The Manitoba Moose moved to St. John's, Newfoundland and Labrador in 2011 and were renamed the St. John's IceCaps after the NHL's Atlanta Thrashers moved to Winnipeg as the second incarnation of the Winnipeg Jets. In 2013, Houston moved to Des Moines, Iowa to become the Iowa Wild. This left Chicago, Grand Rapids and Milwaukee as the only ex-IHL teams still in their original cities until the 2015 relocations when the IceCaps moved back to Winnipeg as the Manitoba Moose.

Relocations and western shift

Beginning with the 2015–16 season, twelve franchises have since relocated due to NHL parent clubs' influence on their development teams and players. Of the twelve relocated franchises, nine were relocated because they were directly owned by NHL teams and the NHL parent club wished to make call-ups from the AHL more practical by having closer affiliates.

In January 2015, the AHL announced the relocation of five existing AHL franchises—Adirondack, Manchester, Norfolk, Oklahoma City, and Worcester—to California as the basis for a new "Pacific Division" becoming Stockton, Ontario, San Diego, Bakersfield, and San Jose respectively. The relocated teams were all affiliated and owned or purchased by teams in the NHL's Pacific Division. The franchise movements continued with two more relocations involving Canadian teams with the St. John's IceCaps going back to Winnipeg as the Manitoba Moose and the Hamilton Bulldogs becoming another iteration of the IceCaps to fulfill the arena contract in St. John's.

In the following seasons, more NHL organizations influenced league membership. In 2016, the Springfield Falcons franchise was purchased by the Arizona Coyotes and relocated to become the Tucson Roadrunners and join the one-year-old Pacific Division. The Falcons were subsequently replaced by the Springfield Thunderbirds, the relocated Portland Pirates franchise under a new ownership group. The Montreal Canadiens-owned IceCaps relocated to the Montreal suburb of Laval, Quebec, and became the Laval Rocket in 2017. The Binghamton Senators were also purchased by the Ottawa Senators and were relocated to Belleville, Ontario, to become the Belleville Senators while the New Jersey Devils' owned Albany Devils were relocated to become the Binghamton Devils.

For the 2018–19 season, a 31st team joined the league with the Colorado Eagles as the NHL's Colorado Avalanche affiliate. With the NHL planning to expand to 32 teams in 2021 with the Seattle Kraken, the Seattle ownership group was approved for a 2021 AHL expansion team, later announced to be the Coachella Valley Firebirds based in Palm Springs, California, following the construction of a new arena. The original plans for the new arena was eventually cancelled and the team postponed their launch by year while new arena plans were developed.

In February 2020, the San Antonio Rampage franchise was bought and relocated by the NHL's Vegas Golden Knights for the 2020–21 season as the Henderson Silver Knights and was moved to the Pacific Division. For the 2021–22 season, the Vancouver Canucks relocated their franchise from Utica to Abbotsford while the Utica Comets agreed to relocate and operate the franchise that was operating as the Binghamton Devils. On May 23, 2022, it was announced that the Stockton Heat would be relocating to Calgary, Alberta, starting the 2022-23 season.

Teams

Teams as of the 2022–23 season

Notes

Timeline

AHL teams of the past and present

Bold teams means they are still active

 Buffalo Bisons (1) (1936; folded)
 Cleveland Falcons (1936–37; renamed the Cleveland Barons)
 New Haven Eagles (1936–43; folded during World War II resurrected 1945)
 Philadelphia Ramblers (1936–41, renamed Philadelphia Rockets)
 Pittsburgh Hornets (1936–56; went on hiatus to wait for new arena, returned 1961)
 Providence Reds  (1936–76; renamed Rhode Island Reds)
 Springfield Indians (1936–42; suspended during World War II; returned 1946)
 Syracuse Stars (1936–40; became Buffalo Bisons)
 Cleveland Barons (1937–1973; became Jacksonville Barons)
Hershey Bears (1938–present)
 Indianapolis Capitals (1939–52; folded)
 Buffalo Bisons (2) (1940–70; folded)
 Philadelphia Rockets (1941–42; folded)
 Washington Lions (1941–43; folded)
 St. Louis Flyers (1944–53; folded)
 New Haven Eagles (1945–46, renamed New Haven Ramblers)
 Springfield Indians (1946–51; became Syracuse Warriors)
 Philadelphia Rockets (1946–49; folded)
 New Haven Ramblers (1946–50, renamed New Haven Eagles)
 Washington Lions (1947–49; became Cincinnati Mohawks)
 Cincinnati Mohawks (1949–52; transferred to IHL)
 New Haven Eagles (1950–51, folded)
 Syracuse Warriors (1951–54; became Springfield Indians)
 Springfield Indians (1954–67; renamed Springfield Kings)
Rochester Americans (1956–present)
 Quebec Aces (1959–71; became Richmond Robins)
 Pittsburgh Hornets (1961–67; folded)
 Baltimore Clippers (1962–76; folded)
 Springfield Kings (1967–74; renamed Springfield Indians)
 Montreal Voyageurs (1969–71; became Nova Scotia Voyageurs)
 Nova Scotia Voyageurs (1971–84; became Sherbrooke Canadiens)
 Boston Braves (1971–74; suspended, became Moncton Hawks)
 Cincinnati Swords (1971–74; folded)
 Richmond Robins (1971–76; folded)
 Tidewater Wings (1971–72; played in Norfolk; renamed Virginia Wings)
 Virginia Wings (1972–75; played in Norfolk; became Adirondack Red Wings)
 Jacksonville Barons (1973–74; folded, franchise purchased and became Syracuse Eagles)
 New Haven Nighthawks (1972–92; became New Haven Senators)
 Springfield Indians (1974–94; became Worcester IceCats)
 Syracuse Eagles (1974–75; folded)
 Rhode Island Reds (1976–77; became Binghamton Dusters)
 Hampton Gulls (1977–78; folded midseason)
 Binghamton Dusters (1977–80; renamed Binghamton Whalers)
 Maine Mariners (1977–92; original franchise became Utica Devils; expansion franchise became Providence Bruins)
 Philadelphia Firebirds (1977–79; became Syracuse Firebirds)
 New Brunswick Hawks (1978–82; became St. Catharines Saints)
 Adirondack Red Wings (1979–99; became San Antonio Rampage)
 Syracuse Firebirds (1979–80; folded)
 Binghamton Whalers (1980–90; renamed Binghamton Rangers)
 Erie Blades (1981–82; merged into Baltimore Skipjacks)
 Fredericton Express (1981–88; became Halifax Citadels)
 Baltimore Skipjacks (1982–93; became Portland Pirates)
 Moncton Alpines (1982–84; renamed Moncton Golden Flames)
 Sherbrooke Jets (1982–84; folded)
 St. Catharines Saints (1982–86; became Newmarket Saints)
 Nova Scotia Oilers (1984–88; became Cape Breton Oilers)
 Sherbrooke Canadiens (1984–90; became Fredericton Canadiens)
 Moncton Golden Flames (1984–87; folded)
 Newmarket Saints (1986–91; became St. John's Maple Leafs)
 Moncton Hawks (1987–94; folded)
 Utica Devils (1987–93; became Saint John Flames)
 Cape Breton Oilers (1988–96; became Hamilton Bulldogs)
 Halifax Citadels (1988–93; became Cornwall Aces)
 Binghamton Rangers (1990–97; became Hartford Wolf Pack)
 Capital District Islanders (1990–93; became Albany River Rats)
 Fredericton Canadiens (1990–99; became Quebec Citadelles)
 St. John's Maple Leafs (1991–2005; became Toronto Marlies)
Providence Bruins (1992–present)
 Hamilton Canucks (1992–94; became Syracuse Crunch)
 New Haven Senators (1992–93; became Prince Edward Island Senators)
 Albany River Rats (1993–2010; became Charlotte Checkers)
 Portland Pirates (1993–2016, became Springfield Thunderbirds)
 Prince Edward Island Senators (1993–96; became Binghamton Senators)
 Saint John Flames (1993–2003; became Omaha Ak-Sar-Ben Knights)
 Cornwall Aces (1993–96; dormant until 1999 and became Wilkes-Barre/Scranton Penguins)
 Springfield Falcons (1994–2016; became Tucson Roadrunners)
Syracuse Crunch (1994–present)
 Worcester IceCats (1994–2005; became Peoria Rivermen)
 Baltimore Bandits (1995–97; became Cincinnati Mighty Ducks)
 Carolina Monarchs (1995–97; became Beast of New Haven)
 Philadelphia Phantoms (1996–2009; became Adirondack Phantoms)
 Hamilton Bulldogs (1996–2015; became second version of the St. John's IceCaps)
 Kentucky Thoroughblades (1996–2001; became Cleveland Barons)
 Cincinnati Mighty Ducks (1997–2005; became Rockford IceHogs)
 Beast of New Haven (1997–99; folded)
Hartford Wolf Pack (1997–2010, 2013–present; became Connecticut Whale from 2010–13)
 Lowell Lock Monsters (1998–2006; became Lowell Devils)
Wilkes-Barre/Scranton Penguins (1999–present)
 Louisville Panthers (1999–2001; became Iowa Stars)
 Quebec Citadelles (1999–2002; merged with Hamilton Bulldogs)
 Norfolk Admirals (2000–15; became the San Diego Gulls)
Bridgeport Sound Tigers (2001–2021; became Bridgeport Islanders)
Chicago Wolves (2001–present)
Grand Rapids Griffins (2001–present)
 Houston Aeros (2001–13; became Iowa Wild)
 Manchester Monarchs (2001–15; became the Ontario Reign)
Milwaukee Admirals (2001–present)
 Cleveland Barons (2001–06; became Worcester Sharks)
Manitoba Moose (2001–11, 2015–present; were the St. John's IceCaps from 2011–2015)
 Utah Grizzlies (2001–05; became Lake Erie Monsters)
 Binghamton Senators (2002–17; became the Belleville Senators in 2017)
 San Antonio Rampage (2002–20; became Henderson Silver Knights)
 Toronto Roadrunners (2003–04; split from Hamilton Bulldogs, became Edmonton Road Runners)
 Edmonton Road Runners (2004–05; dormant 2005–2010, became the Oklahoma City Barons)
 Iowa Stars (2005–08; became Iowa Chops)
 Omaha Ak-Sar-Ben Knights (2005–07; became Quad City Flames)
 Peoria Rivermen (2005–13; became Utica Comets)
Toronto Marlies (2005–present)
 Lowell Devils (2006–10; became Albany Devils)
 Worcester Sharks (2006–15; became the San Jose Barracuda)
 Lake Erie Monsters (2007–16; became Cleveland Monsters)
 Quad City Flames (2007–09; became Abbotsford Heat)
Rockford IceHogs (2007–present)
 Iowa Chops (2008–09; became Texas Stars)
 Adirondack Phantoms (2009–14; became Lehigh Valley Phantoms)
Texas Stars (2009–present)
 Abbotsford Heat (2009–14; became Adirondack Flames)
 Albany Devils (2010–17; became the Binghamton Devils in 2017)
Charlotte Checkers (2010–present)
 Oklahoma City Barons  (2010–15; became the Bakersfield Condors)
 Connecticut Whale (2010–13; reverted to Hartford Wolf Pack)
 St. John's IceCaps (2011–17; original franchise became the Manitoba Moose in 2015, second franchise became the Laval Rocket in 2017)
Iowa Wild (2013–present)
Utica Comets (2013–present; original franchise relocated to Abbotsford in 2021)
 Adirondack Flames (2014–15; became the Stockton Heat)
Lehigh Valley Phantoms (2014–present)
Bakersfield Condors (2015–present)
Ontario Reign (2015–present)
San Diego Gulls (2015–present)
San Jose Barracuda (2015–present)
 Stockton Heat (2015–22; became the Calgary Wranglers)
Cleveland Monsters (2016–present)
Springfield Thunderbirds (2016–present)
Tucson Roadrunners (2016–present)
Belleville Senators (2017–present)
 Binghamton Devils (2017–21; became second version of the Utica Comets)
Laval Rocket (2017–present)
Colorado Eagles (2018–present)
Henderson Silver Knights (2020–present)
Abbotsford Canucks (2021–present)
Bridgeport Islanders (2021–present)
Calgary Wranglers (2022–present)
Coachella Valley Firebirds (2022–present)

All-Star Game
The American Hockey League first held an All-Star Game in the 1941–42 season. The event was not played again until the 1954–55 season, and was then held annually until the 1959–60 season. In the 1994–95 season, the AHL revived the events again, and has been played every season until the COVID-19 pandemic cancelled the events in 2021 and 2022. The skills competition was first introduced for the 1995–96 season. From 1996 to 2010, the game took place between a team of players born outside of Canada and a team of players born within Canada. The All-Star Game was replaced by an all-star challenge between the league's divisions from the 2015–16 season onward. The challenge consists of six round-robin games between the league's divisions; the top two divisions in the challenge's round-robin phase advance to a six-minute championship game. The winning division of the championship game is declared the winner of the all-star challenge.

Outdoor games

Since the 2009–10 season, at least one team in the AHL has hosted an outdoor ice hockey game each year. The Syracuse Crunch was the first organization to put on an outdoor game in the AHL on February 20, 2010, building a rink at the New York State Fairgrounds in Syracuse, New York, and packing a record 21,508 fans in for the Mirabito Outdoor Classic against the Binghamton Senators. The contest, which was also televised to an international audience on NHL Network, was won by the Crunch, 2–1.

The Connecticut Whale hosted the Whale Bowl—the AHL's second outdoor game—on February 19, 2011, as part of a 10-day Whalers Hockey Fest at Rentschler Field in East Hartford, Conn. Attendance for Connecticut's game against the Providence Bruins was announced at 21,673, the largest in AHL history to that point. Providence won, 5–4, in a shootout.

On January 6, 2012, the largest crowd in AHL history saw the Adirondack Phantoms defeat the Hershey Bears, 4–3, in overtime before 45,653 fans at Citizens Bank Park in Philadelphia, Pennsylvania, as the final event of the week-long activities associated with the 2012 NHL Winter Classic, which also included a game between the Philadelphia Flyers and the New York Rangers on Jan 2 and an alumni game between retired players (including eight honored members of the Hockey Hall of Fame) of those two clubs on December 31, 2011. The contest was the third outdoor game in AHL history and it more than doubled the league's previous single-game attendance mark.

On January 21, 2012, the Steeltown Showdown between Ontario rivals the Toronto Marlies and Hamilton Bulldogs was held at Ivor Wynne Stadium in Hamilton, Ont., with the Marlies winning 7–2 in front of 20,565 fans, the largest crowd ever for an AHL game in Canada. The AHL game was preceded the previous night by a game between Toronto Maple Leafs and Montreal Canadiens alumni.

Two outdoor games were announced for the 2012–13 AHL season, but a meeting between the Grand Rapids Griffins and Toronto Marlies at Comerica Park in Detroit as part of the festivities surrounding the NHL Winter Classic was not held because of the cancellation of the NHL Winter Classic. On January 20, 2013, the Hershey Bears and Wilkes-Barre/Scranton Penguins met outdoors at Hersheypark Stadium in Hershey, Pa. The Penguins earned a 2–1 overtime victory in front of 17,311 fans.

The Rochester Americans hosted an outdoor game in 2013–14, the Frozen Frontier, which was held at Frontier Field in Rochester on December 13, 2013. The Americans took a 5–4 decision in a shootout against the Lake Erie Monsters before a standing-room crowd of 11,015 fans. A year after their originally scheduled date, the Griffins and Marlies played at Comerica Park on December 30, 2013, and Toronto prevailed in a shootout, 4–3, becoming the first AHL team ever with two outdoor wins. Attendance in Detroit was 20,337.

As part of the recent addition of the Pacific Division, the AHL played its first outdoor hockey game in California during the 2015–16 season called the Golden State Hockey Rush. On December 18, 2015, the Stockton Heat hosted the Bakersfield Condors at Raley Field in West Sacramento, California. Stockton defeated Bakersfield 3–2 in front of 9,357 fans.

For the second consecutive season, the AHL played an outdoor game in California. The Bakersfield Condors were named as hosts for their second outdoor game against the Ontario Reign to be held on January 7, 2017, at Bakersfield College's Memorial Stadium and was called the Condorstown Outdoor Classic. Despite sometimes heavy rain during the first period, the game went on as scheduled and the Condors defeated the Reign 3–2 in overtime.

Although technically not an outdoor game, the Syracuse Crunch defeated the Utica Comets 2–1 on November 22, 2014 at the Carrier Dome, normally a college football stadium.

AHL Hall of Fame

The formation of an American Hockey League Hall of Fame was announced by the league on December 15, 2005, created to recognize, honor and celebrate individuals for their outstanding achievements and contributions specifically in the AHL.

Trophies and awards
The following is a list of awards of the American Hockey League. The season the award was first handed out is listed in parentheses.

Individual awards
 Les Cunningham Award – Most valuable player (1947–48)
 John B. Sollenberger Trophy – Top point scorer (1947–48)
 Willie Marshall Award – Top goal scorer (2003–04)
 Dudley "Red" Garrett Memorial Award – Rookie of the year (1947–48)
 Eddie Shore Award – Defenceman of the year (1958–59)
 Aldege "Baz" Bastien Memorial Award – Best Goaltender (1983–84)
 Harry "Hap" Holmes Memorial Award – Lowest Goals against average (1947–48)
 Louis A.R. Pieri Memorial Award – Coach of the year (1967–68)
 Fred T. Hunt Memorial Award – Sportsmanship / Perseverance (1977–78)
 Yanick Dupre Memorial Award – Community Service Award (1997–98)
 Jack A. Butterfield Trophy – MVP of the playoffs (1983–84)

Team awards
 Calder Cup – Playoffs champions (1936–37)
 Richard F. Canning Trophy – Eastern Conference playoff champions (1989–90)
 Robert W. Clarke Trophy – Western Conference playoff champions (1989–90)
 Macgregor Kilpatrick Trophy – Regular season champions, League (1997–98)
 Frank Mathers Trophy – Regular Season champions, Eastern Conference (1995–96)
 Norman R. "Bud" Poile Trophy – Regular Season champions, Western Conference (2001–02)
 Emile Francis Trophy – Regular Season champions, Atlantic Division (2001–02)
 F. G. "Teddy" Oke Trophy – Regular Season champions, North Division (1936–37)†
 Sam Pollock Trophy – Regular Season champions, Central Division (1995–96)
 John D. Chick Trophy – Regular Season champions, Pacific Division (1961–62)

† Trophy predates American Hockey League, established 1926–27 in the Canadian Professional Hockey League.

Other awards
 James C. Hendy Memorial Award – Executive of the Year (1961–62)
 Thomas Ebright Memorial Award – Outstanding career contributions (1997–98)
 James H. Ellery Memorial Awards – Outstanding media coverage (1964–65)
 Ken McKenzie Award – Marketing Executive of the Year (1978–79)
 Michael Condon Memorial Award – Outstanding service, On-ice official (2001–02)
 President's Awards – two annual awards given out by the AHL. The first award is presented to an AHL organization and recognizes "excellence in all areas off the ice." The second is given to a player as recognition of outstanding accomplishments in that year (2008–09)

Sources:
 AHL Hall of Fame
 hockeydb.com

See also
 American Hockey Association (1926–1942)
 List of AHL head coaches
 List of AHL seasons
 List of American Hockey League arenas
 List of sports attendance figures
 Minor league
List of ice hockey leagues
 Professional Hockey Players' Association, the collective bargaining union for AHL players

References

External links

 
 Historic standings and statistics – at Internet Hockey Database

 
Minor league ice hockey
Articles which contain graphical timelines
1936 establishments in North America
Sports leagues established in 1936
Professional ice hockey leagues in the United States
Professional ice hockey leagues in Canada
Multi-national professional sports leagues
Second tier ice hockey leagues
Multi-national ice hockey leagues in North America